These are the complete results achieved by BMW cars and engines in Formula One, including Formula Two races that were held concurrently.

Complete Formula One results

As a constructor
(key)
Notes
 – Formula 2 entry.

As an engine supplier
(key)
Notes
 – The Constructors World Championship did not exist before .
 – Ineligible for the Constructors World Championship.
 Ineligible for points.

Non-championship results

As BMW Sauber (2006–2009)

(key)
 Half points awarded as less than 75% of race distance was completed.

References

Formula One constructor results
Grand Prix results